George Wassouf (23 December 1961) is a Syrian singer. In a career spanning more than four decades, he has released more than 30 albums, with a significantly large audience of fans throughout the Arab world. Dubbed Sultan El-Tarab, he is one of the most successful Arab singers selling over 60 million records worldwide.

Early life and career
Wassouf was born in Kafroun, Syria to a Greek Orthodox Christian family. Wassouf started singing at the age of 10 in his hometown Kafroun. He was discovered by his first manager and producer George Yazbeck at a wedding party that Wassouf was performing at, aged 12 years old. At the age of 16, he was called Sultan El-Tarab by the Lebanese journalist George Ibrahim El Khoury, a magazine director, Arabic for The Sultan of Music, with his classic song "el-Hawa Sultan". He became famous after appearing on the Lebanese show Studio El Fan 1980 when he was 19 years old as Sultan of Tarab.  Wassouf holds the Lebanese citizenship.

Wassouf preferred not to shoot music videos for his songs saying: "I don't feel I can act... I really can't... I only find myself when I'm on the stage... singing, but the video clip forces me to act".

Personal life
George Wassouf married his first wife, Shalimar, at the age of 21. They have three children: Wadih who died on 6-January 2023 due to surgery , Hatem and George Jr. The couple separated after 28 years of marriage in 2009.

He was married to Qatar rally champion Nada Zeidan, his second wife. They divorced in 2016. Their daughter, Oyoon, was born in October 2015. 

Wassouf has been a prominent supporter of President Bashar al-Assad's government throughout the Syrian Civil War.

On January 6, 2023, his son Wadih died due to complications from a gastric bypass surgery.

Discography
 1983: Ouwidni Salmtek Byied Allah 
 1984: El Hawa Sultan
 1992: Rouh El Rouh
 1993: She' Ghareeb
 1995: Kalam El Nass
 1996: Leil Al Ashiqeen
 1998: Lissa El Dounya Bi Khair
 1999: Tabeeb Garrah
 2000: Dol Mush Habayib
 2001: Zaman El Ajayib
 2002: Inta Gherhom
 2003: Salaf Wi Deine
 2004: Etakhart Kteer
 2006: Heya El Ayam
 2008: Kalamak Ya Habibi
 2009: Allah Kareem, Shoukran
 2012: Best of Wassouf
 2015: Shtaanelak

Live Albums 
Sings Oum Kolthoum Vol. 1, 1983.
Sings Oum Kolthoum Vol. 2, 1995.
Sings Oum Kolthoum Vol. 3, 1997.
Sings Abdel Halim Hafez, 1998.
Sings Warda, 1999

Singles 
Ahla Ayam El Omr, 1995.
Amri Lellah, 1995.
Mahlak Tmahal Ya Malak, 1995.
Rahal El Batal, 2000.
Ferhat Rejouak Ya Loubnan, 2010.
Dawarat El Ayam, 2010.
Aady Ya Donia, 2011.
Biyehsedouni, 2011.
Seket El Kalam, 2013 
Bisaalouni Aleik, 2013.
Ya Oumi, 2013.
Zekrayat, 2013.
Shouq El Omr, 2013.
Tarakni Ghab, 2014.
Bandahlak, 2017.
Malikat Gamal El Rouh, 2018 
Hal El Garih, 2019.
Sahi El Leil, 2020.
Byetkallem Aalaya, 2022.
Noss Omry,  2023.

Clips 
Yalli Taebna Senin Fi Hawah, 1986.
Ya Moualdani, 1986.
Kalam El Nass, 1994.
Erda Bel Nassib, 1996.
Lissa El Donya Bkheir, 1998.
Tabib Garah, 1999.
Ana Assef, 1999.
Dul Mush Habayeb, 2000.
Ma Teoulou Leih, 2000.
Zaman El Agayeb, 2001.
Youm El Wadaa, 2001.
Salaf We Dayn, 2003.
Etakhart Ktir, 2004.
Sehert El Leyl, 2004.
Leilat Wadaana, 2006.
Asaab Fourak, 2008.
Aallem Albi El Shouk, 2008.
Ferhat Rejouak Ya Loubnan, 2010.
Dawarat El Ayam, 2010.
Biyehsedouni, 2011.
Malikat Gamal El Rouh, 2018.
Hal El Garih, 2019.
Sahi El Leil, 2020.

References

External links
 

1961 births
Living people
Rotana Records artists
Greek Orthodox Christians from Syria
21st-century Syrian male singers
People from Tartus Governorate
Singers who perform in Egyptian Arabic
Singers who perform in Classical Arabic
20th-century Syrian male singers
Syrian male film actors
Syrian male television actors
Naturalized citizens of Lebanon